Georges Merle (1851–1886) was a French painter known for his outstanding command of the female form.  He often submitted works to the Salon in Paris.

His father, Hugues Merle, was also a painter. As Georges rarely signed his early pieces, several of his early works were at first mistakenly attributed to his father.

References

External links
  L'Envoûteuse (The Sorceress), Birmingham Museum of Art

1851 births
1886 deaths
19th-century French painters
French male painters
Burials at Père Lachaise Cemetery
19th-century French male artists